H7N1 is a subtype of the species Influenza A virus (sometimes called bird flu virus).

H7N1 was first isolated in 1972, from Eurasian siskin.

A highly pathogenic strain of it caused a flu outbreak with significant spread to numerous farms, resulting in great economic losses in 1999 in Italy in turkeys.

References

H7N1